Japanese bath may refer to:

 , a type of Japanese communal bath house
 , a type of bathtub commonly used in Japan
 , a Japanese hot spring traditionally used for public bathing
 The bathroom in a Japanese house
 Customs and etiquette of Japan related to bathing